Green Meadows may refer to:

United States
Green Meadows, Los Angeles, a neighborhood in California
Green Meadows, Indiana, an unincorporated community in Tippecanoe County
Green Meadows, Shelby County, Indiana, an unincorporated community
Green Meadows, Prince George's County, Maryland, an unincorporated community
Green Meadows, Ohio, a census-designated place
Green Meadows, Oregon, a census-designated place

Other uses
Green Meadows, a fictional town in early drafts of Rachel Carson's Silent Spring, an American rural idyll turning dystopian, a town without birdsong

References